Joseph Adélard Dubeau (March 25, 1873 – October 10, 1937) was a Canadian politician.

Born in Saint-Ambroise-de-Kildare, Quebec, Dubeau was educated at the College of Joliette and read law in the office of Joseph-Mathias Tellier, the M.L.A. for Joliette. He was first elected to the House of Commons of Canada for the electoral district of Joliette in the general elections of 1904. A Liberal, he was re-elected in 1908 and was defeated in 1911 and 1917.

References
 
 The Canadian Parliament; biographical sketches and photo-engravures of the senators and members of the House of Commons of Canada. Being the tenth Parliament, elected November 3, 1904

1873 births
1937 deaths
Liberal Party of Canada MPs
Members of the House of Commons of Canada from Quebec
Canadian lawyers admitted to the practice of law by reading law